Paket aranžman (Package Tour) is a new wave music compilation album released in 1981 by Jugoton. Featuring eminent Belgrade acts Šarlo Akrobata, Električni Orgazam and Idoli, it is considered to be one of the most important and influential records ever made in SFR Yugoslavia. In addition to critical praise, it reached a cult status among the audiences and continues to be popular across the countries that emerged after the breakup of Yugoslavia.

The album was voted the second best Yugoslav rock album of all time by the music critics in the book YU 100: najbolji albumi jugoslovenske rok i pop muzike. It is second only to Odbrana i poslednji dani by Idoli.

The record was produced by Enco Lesić who initiated the entire project.

Background and recording
During autumn 1980, Belgrade record producer Enco Lesić decided to assemble several young acts from the city's emerging new wave scene in order to come up with a split album that would present and promote the work of these young bands. He brought in three bands consisting of young musicians in their early 20s - Šarlo Akrobata, Električni Orgazam, and Idoli - all three of which barely existed for several months in their current format at this point and virtually had no prior recording experience.

Lesić gave them free recording time in his Druga Maca studio as well as complete artistic freedom.

The sleeve was designed by Branko Gavrić while the photographs used on it were shot by Milinko Stefanović (the wide shot of Belgrade streets on the cover) and Goran Vejvoda (photos within the sleeve).

The main Sound Engineer was Dušan Vasiljević.

Track listing 
 Šarlo Akrobata - Ona se budi (Šarlo Akrobata)
 Električni Orgazam - Krokodili dolaze (S. Gojković, Lj. Đukić)
 Šarlo Akrobata - Oko moje glave (Šarlo Akrobata)
 Idoli - Schwüle über Europa (S. Šaper, V. Divljan)
 Šarlo Akrobata - Mali čovek (Šarlo Akrobata)
 Idoli - Plastika (V. Divljan)
 Idoli - Maljčiki (S. Šaper, V. Divljan)
 Električni Orgazam - Zlatni papagaj (S. Gojković)
 Idoli - Amerika (V. Divljan, Z. Kolar)
 Električni Orgazam - Vi (Lj. Jovanović, S. Vukičević, S. Gojković)
 Šarlo Akrobata - Niko kao ja (Šarlo Akrobata)

Box set reissue 

The compilation was reissued as a box set release, featuring the remastered version of Paket aranžman and Električni Orgazam and Šarlo Akrobata debut albums. The same track listings and album covers were used as on the original releases. A few months later Croatia Records rereleased all Idoli releases on VIS Idoli box set.

 CD 1 - Paket aranžman by Električni Orgazam, Šarlo Akrobata and Idoli
 CD 2 - Električni orgazam by Električni Orgazam
 CD 3 - Bistriji ili tuplji čovek biva kad... by Šarlo Akrobata

See also 
Artistička radna akcija
Novi Punk Val
Svi marš na ples!
Vrući dani i vrele noći
New wave music in Yugoslavia
Punk rock in Yugoslavia

External links and references 
 Paket Aranžman box at Croatia Records official page
"Paket Aranžman" and "Artistička radna akcija" compilations - Review at terapija.net e-zine 

New wave albums by Serbian artists
New wave albums by Yugoslav artists
Punk rock albums by Serbian artists
Punk rock albums by Yugoslav artists
New wave compilation albums
Punk rock compilation albums
Regional music compilation albums
Jugoton compilation albums
Croatia Records compilation albums
1980 compilation albums
Serbian-language albums